Norwood was a parliamentary constituency in south London which returned one Member of Parliament (MP)  to the House of Commons of the Parliament of the United Kingdom by the first past the post system.

History
The constituency existed from 1885 until it was abolished for the 1997 general election. It was held by the Conservative Party for the first 60 years of its existence. It then oscillated between the Conservatives and Labour until 1966, from which point it was held by Labour until its abolition.

Boundaries
1885–1918: Parliamentary borough of Lambeth division no 4: the ward of Norwood and those parts of the wards of Brixton and Stockwell lying south of Coldharbour and Acre Lanes.

1918–1950: The Metropolitan Borough of Lambeth ward of Norwood, and parts of the wards of Herne Hill and Tulse Hill.

1950–1974: The Metropolitan Borough of Lambeth wards of Herne Hill, Knight's Hill, and Tulse Hill.

1974–1983: The London Borough of Lambeth wards of Herne Hill, Knight's Hill, Leigham, Thurlow Park, and Tulse Hill.

1983–1997: The London Borough of Lambeth wards of Angell, Gipsy Hill, Herne Hill, Knight's Hill, St Martin's, Thurlow Park, and Tulse Hill.

Abolition
In 1997 areas were split between the newly created seats Dulwich and West Norwood towards the east, Streatham to the west and Vauxhall to the north.  The first of these is cross-borough, spanning elements of firmly Labour-leaning Lambeth and Southwark London Boroughs.

Members of Parliament

Election results

Elections in the 1880s

Elections in the 1890s

Elections in the 1900s

Elections in the 1910s 

General Election 1914–15:

Another General Election was required to take place before the end of 1915. The political parties had been making preparations for an election to take place and by the July 1914, the following candidates had been selected; 
Unionist: Harry Samuel
Liberal: William Llewellyn Williams

Elections in the 1920s

Elections in the 1930s

Elections in the 1940s 
General election 1939–40

Another general election was required to take place before the end of 1940. The political parties had been making preparations for an election to take place and by the Autumn of 1939, the following candidates had been selected; 
Conservative: Duncan Sandys
Labour: 
Liberal:

Elections in the 1950s

Elections in the 1960s

Elections in the 1970s

Elections in the 1980s

Elections in the 1990s

References 

 The Constitutional Year Book 1937 (London: National Union of Conservative and Unionist Associations, 1937)

Parliamentary constituencies in London (historic)
Constituencies of the Parliament of the United Kingdom established in 1885
Constituencies of the Parliament of the United Kingdom disestablished in 1997
Politics of the London Borough of Lambeth
History of the London Borough of Lambeth